A camp shirt, variously known as a cabin shirt, Cuban collar shirt, cabana shirt, and lounge shirt, is a loose, straight-cut, woven, short-sleeved button-front shirt or blouse with a simple placket front opening and a "camp collar" - a one-piece collar (no band collar) that can be worn open and spread or closed at the neck with a button and loop. It usually has a straight hemmed bottom falling at hip level, not intended to be tucked into trousers. While generally made from plain, single color fabrics, variants include duo tone bowling shirts and print patterned aloha shirts.

References

Tops (clothing)
Shirts